Għargħar Battery, also known as Ta' Ittuila Battery and Ta' Xindi Battery, was an artillery battery in present-day San Ġwann, Malta, built by Maltese insurgents during the French blockade of 1798–1800. It was part of a chain of batteries, redoubts and entrenchments encircling the French positions in Marsamxett Harbour and the Grand Harbour.

Location
Għargħar Battery was located in an area known as San Ġwann tal-Għargħar, which is now part of San Ġwann. It overlooked Gżira and Manoel Island, on which there was the French-occupied Fort Manoel.

Description
The battery had a linear gun platform and a high masonry parapet with six embrasures. The battery had flanking walls on either sides of the platform, and a high rubble wall at the rear. Sentry boxes were located in at least three of the four corners of the battery. Two of these were fitted with flagpoles flying the White Ensign and the flag of the Kingdom of Sicily. Għargħar Battery is significant as being the first place where the British flag was raised in Malta. The battery also had a vaulted underground casemate for the accommodation of the garrison.

History
The battery was built by Vincenzo Borg, and was completed by 6 October 1798. It was armed with five 18-pounder cannons, some of which were taken from Mistra Battery. The battery had an advanced post at Il-Ħarrub ta' Stiefnu, which was armed with a single gun. The battery's garrison consisted of 338 men in December 1799.

Għargħar Battery tried to fire on the capital Valletta, but it was too far away and the bombardment had little effect on it. The French attempted to attack the battery in 1799 but were driven back.

Għargħar Battery still existed in 1811, but like the other French blockade fortifications, it was dismantled, possibly after 1814. No traces of the battery can be seen today, and the area is now built up. According to Arnold Cassola, some remains still exist.

See also
 Ta' Xindi Farmhouse

References

Batteries in Malta
San Ġwann
Military installations established in 1798
Demolished buildings and structures in Malta
French occupation of Malta
Vernacular architecture in Malta
Limestone buildings in Malta
1798 establishments in Malta
18th-century fortifications
18th Century military history of Malta